Li Xiaoqin (born 7 December 1961) is a Chinese former basketball player who competed in the 1984 Summer Olympics and in the 1988 Summer Olympics.

References

1961 births
Living people
Basketball players from Hunan
Chinese women's basketball players
Olympic basketball players of China
Basketball players at the 1984 Summer Olympics
Basketball players at the 1988 Summer Olympics
Olympic bronze medalists for China
Olympic medalists in basketball
Medalists at the 1984 Summer Olympics